John Ramsbottom (1778–1845) was a British Whig politician and landowner, MP for New Windsor from 1810 until his death in 1845.

In 1810, he succeeded his uncle Richard Ramsbottom as MP for the constituency of New Windsor.

He lived at Clewer Lodge and Woodside, Windsor, Berkshire.

References

1778 births
1845 deaths
People from Windsor, Berkshire
Members of the Parliament of the United Kingdom for English constituencies
UK MPs 1806–1807
UK MPs 1807–1812
UK MPs 1812–1818
UK MPs 1818–1820
UK MPs 1820–1826
UK MPs 1826–1830
UK MPs 1830–1831
UK MPs 1837–1841
UK MPs 1841–1847